Light Up the Dark may refer to:

 Light Up the Dark (album), a 2015 album by Gabrielle Aplin, or the title track
 "Light Up the Dark" (Taylor Henderson song), 2016